is a Japanese former figure skating coach and pair skater. With his skating partner, Kotoe Nagasawa, he became a five-time (1967–1971) Japanese national champion and competed at the 1972 Winter Olympics, placing 16th.

After retiring from competition, Nagakubo became a coach at the Howa Sports Land Skating Club in the Aichi Prefecture. He ceased coaching on September 3, 2017, due to family circumstances. During his career, his students included:
 Shizuka Arakawa
 Ryuju Hino
 Takeshi Honda
 Rika Hongo
 Haruka Imai
 Yura Matsuda
 Rin Nitaya
 Akiko Suzuki. He coached Suzuki from the early 2000s until her retirement in 2014.
 Sota Yamamoto
 Yuhana Yokoi

Competitive highlights
with Kotoe Nagasawa

References

External links 

Figure skaters at the 1972 Winter Olympics
1946 births
Living people
Japanese male pair skaters
Olympic figure skaters of Japan
Japanese figure skating coaches
People from Yamanashi Prefecture